Anthony Richards may refer to:

 Tony Richards (footballer, born 1934) (1934–2010), English footballer
 Anthony Charles Richards (born 1953), British Army officer
 Anthony Richards (Shortland Street)
 Anthony D. Richards, English footballer

See also 
 Tony Richards (disambiguation)